The 1961 All-Ireland Minor Hurling Championship was the 31st staging of the All-Ireland Minor Hurling Championship since its establishment by the Gaelic Athletic Association in 1928.

Kilkenny entered the championship as the defending champions.

On 3 September 1961 Kilkenny won the championship following a 3-13 to 0-15 defeat of Tipperary in the All-Ireland final. This was their second All-Ireland title in-a-row and their sixth title overall.

Results

Leinster Minor Hurling Championship

Munster Minor Hurling Championship

Ulster Minor Hurling Championship

All-Ireland Minor Hurling Championship

Semi-final

Final

External links
 All-Ireland Minor Hurling Championship: Roll Of Honour

Minor
All-Ireland Minor Hurling Championship